Mikhail Sergeyevich Lobanov (born 24 February 1984) is a Russian mathematician, left-wing politician, trade union activist, and associate professor at Moscow State University.

Biography 
Mikhail Lobanov was born into a family of engineers: his father worked as a builder, and his mother was a garment manufacturing technologist. Graduated from Moscow State University with a degree in discrete mathematics in 2006. Candidate of Physical and Mathematical Sciences since 2009 (the topic of his PhD thesis "On the relationship between algebraic immunity and nonlinearity of Boolean functions"). In addition to teaching at the university, he leads school math clubs.

Since his student years, he participated in grassroots activism and the trade union movement (among other things, he personally supported the strike of workers at a cement plant in the city of Mikhaylov, Ryazan Oblast). A number of intra-university campaigns aimed at protecting the interests of students and teachers of Moscow State University are associated with his name.

In 2007, he organized a film club with his comrades at MSU, supported a group of dissatisfied students of the Faculty of Sociology (OD-Group). In 2009, he was among the founders and leaders of the "Initiative Group of students, graduate students and employees of Moscow State University", which arose from a successful campaign against the university administration's attempt to tighten the rules of admission to dormitories. Co-founder (in 2013) of the independent trade union "University Solidarity", member of the trade union committee at Moscow State University and the central council of the trade union association.

During the 2012 Russian protests, he was one of the organizers of scientific and educational columns at opposition marches. He is also known as a participant in urban protection and environmental actions (including the protection of historical buildings and green areas from construction business) in the Ramenka district, where the main complex of MSU is located. Like a number of other representatives of the scientific and pedagogical community, he criticized and protested against the Law on Educational Activities.

For his public activities, he was under pressure from the administration and twice, in 2013 and 2018, he was subjected to attempts to dismiss from the university, but thanks to the solidarity campaign, he was reinstated as a teacher of the Faculty of Mechanics and Mathematics of MSU.

Lobanov himself supported political prisoners, including fellow mathematicians Dmitry Bogatov and Azat Miftakhov, as well as members of the editorial board of the student magazine "DOXA".

In the municipal elections in Moscow in 2022, he supported such candidates as Konstantin Konkov, Arseniy Lytar, Denis Zhilin, Vladlena Mokrousova, Nikita Kozlov.

2021 legislative election 
In 2021 Lobanov was nominated by Communist Party of the Russian Federation (despite the fact that he is not a member of the party) and received the support from Smart Voting as a candidate for the State Duma of the Russian Federation in the 197th Kuntsevo single-mandate constituency. His main competitor was the candidate from the Moscow mayor's office, the TV presenter Yevgeny Popov, who was nominated by United Russia party and endorsed by Mayor Sergey Sobyanin.

According to the results of voting in precincts, Lobanov comfortably led by a margin of more than 10 thousand votes, however, after the publication of the results of remote electronic voting (DEG), it turned out that he lost to Popov. According to official data, he received 72,805 votes (31.65%) - the best indicator among all opposition candidates in Moscow districts.

Mikhail Lobanov did not recognize the results of the elections, urging other opposition candidates to join the fight for annulment of the results. Lobanov took part in the CPRF rally on Pushkinskaya Square on the night of September 20. Lobanov organized a meeting with State Duma member Denis Parfyonov in Ramenki on September 23 in order to promote cancellation of the results of remote electronic voting (DEG).

On September 23 police visited Lobanov on the eve of the September 25 rally, as well as other protest leaders.

Political views 
In terms of political views, he defines himself as a democratic socialist; among ideologically close foreign politicians, he names United States Senator Bernie Sanders and former leader of the British Labour Party Jeremy Corbyn. The key points of his electoral program in 2021, using the leitmotif of "fighting blatant economic and political inequality," were raising the minimum wage, increasing the progressive scale of taxation, increasing spending on education and science, canceling pension reform and lowering the retirement age, and protecting the environment. Lobanov's campaign was supported by independent trade unions (Confederation of Labour of Russia) and a number of left-wing organizations (Russian Socialist Movement, Marxist Tendency, Union of Democratic Socialists and others).

Mikhail Lobanov opposes Russian invasion to Ukraine. On 7 June 2022 he was arrested by the police for anti-war banner «No War». In 24 June 2022, he was detained for fifteen days by Russian police and fined 40 000 rubles for having made statements on social media opposing the 2022 Russian invasion of Ukraine.

Electoral history 

|-
! colspan=2 style="background-color:#E9E9E9;text-align:left;vertical-align:top;" |Candidate
! style="background-color:#E9E9E9;text-align:left;vertical-align:top;" |Party
! style="background-color:#E9E9E9;text-align:right;" |Votes
! style="background-color:#E9E9E9;text-align:right;" |%
|-
|style="background-color: " |
|align=left|Yevgeny Popov
|align=left|United Russia
|80,894
|35.17%
|-
|style="background-color: " |
|align=left|Mikhail Lobanov
|align=left|Communist Party
|72,805
|31.65%
|-
|style="background-color: " |
|align=left|Aleksandr Tarnavsky
|align=left|A Just Russia — For Truth
|13,421
|5.84%
|-
|style="background-color: "|
|align=left|Boris Balmont
|align=left|New People
|11,709
|5.09%
|-
|style="background-color: " |
|align=left|Kirill Goncharov
|align=left|Yabloko
|11,648
|5.06%
|-
|style="background-color: " |
|align=left|Pavel Ramensky
|align=left|Liberal Democratic Party
|10,475
|4.55%
|-
|style="background-color: " |
|align=left|Darya Mitina
|align=left|Communists of Russia
|6,493
|2.82%
|-
|style="background: ;"| 
|align=left|Igor Glek
|align=left|The Greens
|5,473
|2.38%
|-
|style="background: ;"| 
|align=left|Vladislava Gorshkova
|align=left|Green Alternative
|5,436
|2.36%
|-
|style="background-color:"|
|align=left|Aleksey Sobolev
|align=left|Rodina
|3,789
|1.65%
|-
|style="background-color:"|
|align=left|Mikhail Menshikov
|align=left|Party of Growth
|3,604
|1.57%
|-
| colspan="5" style="background-color:#E9E9E9;"|
|- style="font-weight:bold"
| colspan="3" style="text-align:left;" | Total
| 230,007
| 100%
|-
| colspan="5" style="background-color:#E9E9E9;"|
|- style="font-weight:bold"
| colspan="4" |Source:
|
|}

References

External links 
 
 
 Сайт кандидата в депутаты Государственной Думы Михаила Лобанова
 Математик и политик. Как доцент МГУ конкурирует на западе и юго-западе Москвы с «журналистом ВГТРК» // Новая газета

Russian mathematicians
Russian socialists
Politicians from Arkhangelsk
Moscow State University alumni
Living people
1984 births
Russian activists against the 2022 Russian invasion of Ukraine